Baxter Lakes is a lake in Alberta, Canada, situated approximately  northeast of Wainwright.  The lake is an area of environmental and national significance, according to Alberta Parks.

Baxter Lakes has the name of a surveyor's assistant.

See also
List of lakes of Alberta

References

Lakes of Alberta